Uwe Bialon (born 20 August 1963) is a German professional football manager and former player. He made his single Bundesliga appearance for VfB Stuttgart on 23 October 1982 in a 5–2 win over VfL Bochum.

References

External links 
 

1963 births
Living people
People from Aalen
Sportspeople from Stuttgart (region)
German footballers
Association football forwards
Bundesliga players
2. Bundesliga players
Cypriot First Division players
VfR Aalen players
VfB Stuttgart players
Tennis Borussia Berlin players
Hertha BSC players
SG Wattenscheid 09 players
AEL Limassol players
German expatriate footballers
Expatriate footballers in Cyprus
German football managers
Footballers from Baden-Württemberg